Plectrohyla ixil is a species of frog in the family Hylidae.
It is found in Guatemala and Mexico.
Its natural habitats are subtropical or tropical moist montane forests and rivers.
It is threatened by habitat loss.

References

Plectrohyla
Amphibians described in 1942
Taxonomy articles created by Polbot